The Pakistan Maritime Security Agency (reporting name: PMSA) is a branch of the Pakistan Navy. It is a Navy-managed and Navy-controlled law enforcement agency whose mission is to provide protection to the Pakistan's maritime interests and enforcement of maritime law with jurisdiction over the domestic and international waters of Pakistan including the exclusive economic zone.  Pakistan Maritime security agency should not be confused with Pakistan Coast Guards which is security force under Pakistan Army.

Created on 1 January 1987 in compliance to the UN Convention on Law of the Sea of 1982, the PMSA functions as a federal regulatory agency under the Ministry of Defence (MoD) whose command level leadership and personnel comes directly from the Pakistan Navy. Apart from enforcing maritime law, the PMSA conduct to assists in military operations against human trafficking, smuggling, and deep sea search and rescue.

The leadership of the agency comes from the external billets appointment approved by the Pakistan Navy and its executive officer is designated as the Director-General who usually at the two-star rank admiral a senior flag officer of Rear Admiral rank in the Navy.  The current director of the agency is Rear-Admiral Muhammad Shuaib who took the directorship of the agency in 2020.

Since 2014, the mission objectives and area of responsibility of the PMSA has expanded substantially like to provide maritime protection to the China-Pakistan Economic Corridor.

Mission
The mission of Pakistan Maritime Security Agency states:

History

In 1971, the Ministry of Defense (MoD) had established the Pakistan Coast Guard but the Coast Guards were under the command of the Pakistan Army and were unable to perform the deep sea search and rescue operations or enforce maritime law to protect Pakistan's maritime interests.  The void had been filled by the Indian Navy and the Indian Coast Guard that had been very active in the Indian Ocean.  The Navy had to perform the coast guard duties apart from the combat service and had to deploy its assets to guard the maritime interests of the country.

The MoD established the Maritime Affairs Wing in 1986 to lay the framework of the agency as the Pakistan Navy undertook the task by establishing the agency from its manpower and provided the leadership with Rear-Admiral S.R. Hussain becoming its first Director-General on 1 August 1986.

On 1 January 1987, the Pakistan Maritime Security Agency (PMSA) was established for law enforcement and protecting the maritime interests of the country, and a parliamentary act that was passed in 1994 to provide the legal jurisdiction to the agency to perform its operations and task. In 1997, the MSA gained its constitutional mandate after ratification of the  Convention on the Law of the Sea.

The Maritime Security Agency conducts exercises with the other coast guards of the world. In May 2005, the PMSA agreed to establish liaison links with the Indian Coast Guard.

Roles and functions

Pakistan Maritime Security Agency has roles in maritime homeland security, national and international maritime law enforcement (MLE), search and rescue (SAR), marine environmental protection (MEP), and the maintenance of intracoastal and offshore aids to navigation (ATON).  The agency is mandate to protect the fishing vessels and crew against any threat within the Maritime Zones (MZ).

The agency performs military operations authorized by the Ministry of Defence to protect the economic and maritime interests of Pakistan. The agency also provides security and assists governmental agencies, international organizations and the Pakistan Navy in petroleum and other mineral exploration in Pakistan's naval zones. The agency coordinates the  oceanographic research and other scientific activities of the Navy Hydrographic Department.

Organizational headquarters

The Pakistan Maritime Security Agency (PMSA) is a branch within the Navy, and is headquartered near the vicinity of the Karachi Fish Harbour and the KSEW Ltd. in Karachi, Sindh, Pakistan. Since it was established in 1987, the PMSA was headquartered in different hired commercial buildings, most notably, the Karachi Port Trust Building until the new headquarters were constructed and inaugurated on 15 January 2011.

Leadership and the personnel are directly appointed from the Navy and the agency consists of a Director-General and it is commanded by a two-star rank, a Rear-Admiral seconded from Pakistan Navy. The headquarters of the agency and personnel are placed under the command of Commander of Coastal Areas (COMCOAST), who usually supervise the operations for the Ministry of Defence.

Commissioned officers and enlisted rank
The Maritime Security Agency is an agency within the Navy, therefore, it uses the same ranks and insignia as the Pakistan Navy as all of its members are active-duty personnel of the Navy.

Equipment

Vessels
 
Pakistan Maritime Security Agency operates several vessels built locally at KSEW Ltd. and in China's Huangpu and Xijiang shipyards. It also has some vessels transferred from the United States Coast Guard. PMSA currently operates three squadrons as listed below:

Aircraft
The Pakistan Maritime Security Agency operates one aircraft squadron known as Squadron 93 PMSA. The squadron was inaugurated on 23 June 1988 with the induction of a Fokker F27 Friendship an interim measure, for sea surveillance. The aircraft was stationed at Jinnah Terminal for the purpose of logistics support. In 1993, the PMSA acquired the Britten-Norman Defender stationed at Mehran Naval Air Station.

Bases 
PMSA currently operates from five bases namely:

 Headquarter PMSA
 Logistic Unit PMSS INDUS
 Coastal Base GWADAR
 PMSA Base RISHAD
 Keti Bandar
 Mehran Naval Air Station

References

External links 
 

Pakistan Navy
Coast guards
Federal law enforcement agencies of Pakistan
1987 establishments in Pakistan
Government agencies established in 1987
Maritime safety
Military in Sindh
Military in Balochistan, Pakistan
Maritime law enforcement agencies